Jennifer Conlin is an American journalist and politician who is serving as a member of the Michigan House of Representatives, representing the 48th district since 2023. A member of the Democratic Party, her district covers parts of Washtenaw, Livingston, and Jackson counties, including northern Ann Arbor as well as the townships of Genoa, Hamburg, and Northfield.

Early life and education 
Conlin was born and raised in Washtenaw County, Michigan. She attended the University of Michigan where she earned a bachelor's degree in English, and earned her graduate degree in journalism from Northwestern University.

Career 
Conlin held a career in journalism for over three decades, living abroad to write news articles and feature stories from around the world, primarily writing for The New York Times. She works alongside her husband, Daniel Rivkin, whom she met in college and is a fellow journalist. Since 2010, they settled in Ann Arbor to care for Conlin's parents and continued writing about stories throughout Michigan, including for Hour Detroit. Topics of her stories include small businesses, healthcare, culture, and economic development. She was one of the first reporters to cover the 2021 Oxford High School shooting.

Michigan House of Representatives 
In the 2022 elections for the Michigan House of Representatives, redistricting created an open seat in the northern Ann Arbor suburbs. Conlin announced her candidacy for the swing district, facing general election opposition from Republican nominee Jason Woolford, a U.S. Marine Corps veteran from Howell. In one of the closest races in the chamber, Conlin defeated Woolford with 53.1% of the vote.

Conlin took office to the 102nd Michigan Legislature on January 1, 2023. She chairs the Military, Veterans, and Homeland Security committee, and is a member of the committees on Education, Health Policy, and Transportation.

Personal life 
Conlin married Daniel Rivkin in 1990 after they met in college. They have three children and currently reside in Ann Arbor.

References

External links 
 Official website
 Campaign website
 
 Profile at Vote Smart

20th-century American journalists
21st-century American journalists
21st-century American women politicians
Democratic Party members of the Michigan House of Representatives
Living people
Journalists from Michigan
Northwestern University alumni
People from Washtenaw County, Michigan
Politicians from Ann Arbor, Michigan
The New York Times writers
University of Michigan alumni